Ispanaklı Selanik Böreği (Ispanaklı Boşnak Böreği; Zeljanica in Bosnian) is a Turkish and Bosnian savory spinach pie. The börek gets its name from Selanik. The name means Bosnian spinach börek (Ispanaklı Boşnak Böreği) because börek is extremely common in Bosnia and Herzegovina.

See also
Burek
Rustico (pastry)
Gibanica
Spanakopita
List of Turkish dishes
List of pies, tarts and flans
List of snack foods

References

Turkish pastries
Bosnia and Herzegovina pastries
Savoury pies
Snack foods
Spinach dishes
Lenten foods